Turner v. Driver, No. 16-10312 (5th Cir. 2017), is a 2017 decision of the United States Court of Appeals for the Fifth Circuit that affirmed the First Amendment right to record the police. One of the officers involved was criminally indicted for a similar incident around the same time.

Background
Philip Turner (AKA "The Battousai," after his YouTube channel) was standing on the sidewalk, across the street from the police station, recording. Several police officers came over, including at least one police car. Turner was questioned about what he was doing. The officers then demanded he provide identification, which he refused, citing Texas law which does not require a person to identify themselves unless arrested. According to the complaint, officers put Turner in the back seat of the cruiser, since he refused to give ID, saying "We're gonna make you sweat," and Turner demanded to speak to a supervisor. Lieutenant Driver showed up, also requesting Turner's identification which was also refused. After a short period of time, which was not more particularly described, Turner was released.

Decision
The court found that:

We conclude that First Amendment principles, controlling authority, and persuasive precedent demonstrate that a First Amendment right to record the police does exist, subject only to reasonable time, place, and manner restrictions.

References 

2017 in United States case law
United States Court of Appeals for the Fifth Circuit cases